"Gorillas on the Mast" is the fifth episode of the thirty-first season of the American animated television series The Simpsons, and the 667th episode overall. It aired in the United States on Fox on November 3, 2019. The writer was Max Cohn.

Plot
The Simpson family visits the Aquatraz Water Park, where Lisa notices how unhappy the animals are behind glass, including a penguin funeral, while Homer notices how much fun boat owners have, remembering how much he wanted one as a kid while fishing with his father.

A boat salesman notices Homer watching the boats and convinces him to buy one. Bart, Lisa, and Groundskeeper Willie go back to the water park to free the whale trapped in it, with Bart finally understanding altruism and liking it. Homer takes the family on a ride on his boat called the 'Something's Fishy' and even Marge agrees it was a good idea to buy it.

The next rider on the boat is Grampa. But when they return to the pier, the boat starts sinking and Raphael offers his help as a mechanic while Bart is sharing a plan with Milhouse to free other animals in his newfound spirit of altruism.

Homer offers Lenny and Carl to share the boat, and the expenses to fix it. Bart and Milhouse go to the Springfield Zoo and free a gorilla named Lolo, but he goes on a rampage while Milhouse narrowly escapes getting eaten by two tigers.

Bart calls Lisa for help since the police are useless on capturing Lolo. Homer starts co-owning the boat with even more people and the boat sinks due to the weight. Lolo rampages at the Springfield Elementary School and Lisa stops him using Seinfeld to calm him down.

Lisa takes Lolo home to help him go back to a life of freedom and takes him to Dr. Jane Goodall at the Pennsylvania Ape Reserve where he will be loved. At Moe's Tavern, it ends well when Homer convinces the co-owners of being as good as someone who owns a boat because they owned one for five minutes.

Reception
Dennis Perkins of The A.V. Club gave the episode a C stating, “Lisa frees a killer whale. Bart frees a gorilla. Homer buys a boat. Bare story bones. Nothing wrong with that. The Simpsons’ world is made up of outlandish situations rendered possible, sometimes even plausible, by animation and the show's forgiving rules of reality. Some of the best episodes sound just as sparse in outline. Homer goes to space. Springfield gets a monorail. Lisa and Bart thwart a supervillain's plot to drown Springfield."

Tony Sokol of Den of Geek gave the episode a 2.5 out of 5, stating that the episode "doesn't truly shine. There are a lot of very funny lines and gags, but nothing which truly distinguishes it as comic gold. This isn't the fault of Lisa's social justice warmongering. Kent Brockman offers cutting commentary after Lolo wreaks havoc on Springfield saying, 'The police, as always, are useless.' Which cuts to a scene where Springfield's bluest kill a perfectly harmless balloon. The water is only tepid and while good gags are on tap, they are not premium blend."

References

External links

2019 American television episodes
The Simpsons (season 31) episodes